Shafiq Badr (died June 27, 2013) was a Lebanese politician. He was MP for Chouf (19721992).

References

2013 deaths
Members of the Parliament of Lebanon
Year of birth missing